The Honda CD125TC Benly is a , air-cooled, four-stroke, twin-cylinder "commuter" style motorcycle manufactured by the Honda Motor Company between 1982 and 1985 for the United Kingdom. Its engine size and power output were designed to conform to provisional licence restrictions of the time and it was a version of the Honda CD200 Benly introduced in the late 1970s, with the same four-speed constant mesh transmission (as the 200) but electric start only. The machine was identical in all other respects apart from the engine barrel size. It was equipped with an enclosed chain and capacitor discharge electronic ignition. Brakes were drum front and rear and it had both centre- and side-stands. Electrics were 12 volt, and the battery was housed in the right-hand, side-panel. The left-hand panel contained a small toolkit. Instrumentation was by way of two handlebar-mounted binnacles. One contained a speedometer, with odometer and trip meter and was in miles per hour with markings for kilometres and maximum speeds in gears. The other contained warning lights for main beam, ignition/neutral and indicators.

References

Sources

CD125TC Benly
Motorcycles introduced in 1982
Standard motorcycles
Motorcycles powered by straight-twin engines